The Bocskai uprising, known in Hungary as Bocskai's War of Independence was a revolt which took place in Hungary, Transylvania and modern Slovakia during the Long Turkish War (between 1604 and 1606) against Emperor Rudolf II. The rebel leader was Stephen Bocskai, a Protestant Hungarian nobleman. The Ottoman wars had burdened the Kingdom of Hungary for years, causing famine and disease, and the armies of the Christian states had been weakened by losses to Ottoman and Tatar forces.

Rudolf II persecuted the Protestants, and the wealthy Hungarian noblemen were falsely accused of treason. Bocskai organized the revolt and persuaded the Hungarian military Hajduks to join, defeating the imperial forces and foreign mercenaries. The Hungarian nobility, soldiers and peasants (including the minorities) joined Bocskai's Hajduk army. Although he was supported by the Ottoman Empire, the Crimean Khanate, Moldavia, Transylvania and Wallachia, he prevented an Ottoman siege of Vienna. Bocskai was declared Prince of Transylvania and Hungary, but recognized that total Hungarian independence impossible against the Habsburg monarchy and the Ottoman Empire. He blazed a political trail for his supporters: the preservation of an independent Transylvania, a potential base for the unification of Hungary.

Background

Archduke Ferdinand I of Austria, who became Holy Roman Emperor in 1556, had centralized the military and finances of the Habsburg Empire. The border fortress system was imported from Vienna during the 16th century. Pozsony and Szepes (Spiš) were governed from Vienna, and the Court Chamber (Hofkammer) had no Hungarian members. 

Complaints in the national parliaments included the behavior of foreign officials and mercenaries and the fact that the Habsburgs spent little time in Hungary. Rudolf moved his residence from Vienna to Prague in 1583; it was safer from the Ottomans, but further from Hungary. After the 1562 death of Palatine Tamás Nádasdy, his position remained vacant until 1608.

Prelude  
In 1591, the Long Turkish War began. The Habsburg Monarchy (Austria, Bohemia, Hungary, Croatia, and Moravia) joined the Transylvanian and Ottoman vassal states of Moldavia and Wallachia. Several European states also sent troops to Hungary. The Papal State primarily recruited foreign Walloon and Italian mercenaries for the war. The Habsburg and Spanish kings also employed Walloon mercenaries in addition to German, Italian and Spanish soldiers.

The Christian forces suppressed the Ottomans early in the war until the Battle of Keresztes (1596), when they were defeated. The war then dragged on, wearing out Hungary, Transylvania, and Croatia. The Habsburgs spent their military budget, and the unpaid mercenaries (particularly the Walloons) ventured into Hungary and Transylvania. The Tatar auxiliary of the Ottoman army wrought havoc in Hungary, and several thousand men died of hunger and disease.

The Long Turkish War's effects on Transylvanian domestic policy 
With minor clashes escalating along the border, the Long Turkish War began as early as 1591. More serious combat took place in 1593, when Sultan Murad III nullified the 1568 Treaty of Adrianople and declared war on the Habsburgs. Although the sultan called on Zsigmond Báthory to join the Ottoman army, he decided to join the anti-Ottoman league on the advice of his uncle Stephen Bocskai (captain of Várad, present-day Oradea) and the Jesuit priest Alonso Carrillo. Most of the Transylvanian Assembly feared that Turkish troops would loot Transylvania before the Christian army arrived, however, and the prince's plan was not adopted. Zsigmond Báthory resigned from the principality in the summer of 1594 in favor of his cousin, Boldizsár Báthory, who represented the Turks.

Bocskai began working behind the scenes to reverse this. After visiting the prince's trustees, he asked for soldiers. The Assembly of Kolozsvár passed a resolution dissolving the Turkish alliance and supporting the emperor. On orders from Sigismund, the opposition lords, the prince (Boldizsár Báthory), his cousin, chancellor Farkas Kovacsóczy, councilor Sándor Kendy (father-in-law of Boldizsár Báthory and Farkas Kovacsóczy), Ferenc Kendy (brother of Sándor János Kendy), Gábor Kendy Gergely and László Szalánczy from Branyicska were captured and executed. Others were imprisoned because prince Sigismund Bathory had pardoned János Gerendi, Albert Lónyai, György Szalánczi and Boldizsár Szilvásy.

The war was indecisive, and the Kingdom of Hungary was destroyed by German and Walloon mercenaries. Transylvania suffered the most from the war, which became a long-term civil war as a result of Zsigmond (Sigismund) Báthory's repeated resignations and returns. Rudolf appointed Michael the Brave Voivode of Transylvania; Michael overthrew the principality, briefly uniting Transylvania, Wallachia and Moldavia under one single ruler. Rudolf allowed him to be assassinated, replacing him with general Giorgio Basta.

The financial problems of the Habsburg Empire 
At the turn of the 17th century, the Long Turkish War led to the empire accumulating millions of Rhine forints in annual debt. In some years of the 15-year war, expenditures were five million forints; this created annual budget deficits of 800,000 to 1.5 million forints, which could only be resolved with credit. Annual revenue during the 1570s was 2–2.5 million Rhine forints, and the debt was sometimes 1,500 percent of that. Rudolf, his advisors and nobility tried to alleviate the fiscal problems by confiscating the property of the Hungarian aristocracy. Infringement (high treason) and betrayal lawsuits were brought against the wealthiest Hungarian barons and families, usually with the loss of property and goods. The idea originated with local Catholic priests, whose targets were Protestant. Legal proceedings were even brought against soldiers in the Long Turkish War: Sigismund Rákóczi, Tamás Nádasdy, Mihály Telekessy, and the Alaghy, Balassa, Drugeth and Kállay families from Homonna. The first verdict was handed down in March 1603 in the case of Istvan Illésházy, whose castles and estates were confiscated; however, he escaped to Poland.

Religion conflict 
Unlike Emperor Maximilian I, who was tolerant of Protestants, Rudolf II supported the enforced conversion of Protestants to the Catholic faith. The Counter-Reformation began in the Habsburg Austrian and Styrian provinces (where Lutheranism was dominant) and Hungary (where Calvinism prevailed, although the cities of Upper Hungary were Lutheran). During the Long Turkish War, Rudolf turned Protestant churches over to Catholics.

Gabriel Bethlen's letter 
Gabriel Bethlen wrote to ask Stephen Bocskai to lead them against the illegitimate king. On behalf of those who fled to Turkish territory, Bethlen encouraged Bocskai to spearhead an anti-Habsburg uprising with the prospect of a Turkish alliance. Bocskai had a key position when he supported his nephew Sigismund Báthory and was a battle-hardened leader. Their correspondence was intercepted by Giovan Giacomo Barbiano di Belgioioso, captain of Kassa. Bocskai had to hire former Hajduks to defend himself from an imperial attempt to prevent his arrest for treason and save his property from consfication.

Uprising

Beginning
Some of Bocskai's men betrayed him about Turkish relations. Cyprian Concini (vice-captain of Varad) made a deal with him; Concini reported it to Giovan Giacomo Barbiano di Belgioioso, who ordered Bocskai to his camp in Rakamaz. The traitors (Szentjobb captain Ferenc Székely, judge Dáz Lázár Posgai, and István Fráter) handed Szentjobb to Concini. The following day, Concini attacked Bocskai's fortress in Nagykereki. Bocskai had recruited 300 Hajduks; the Hajduks of Kölesér and the castle soldiers under the command of Örvéndy formed the core of his army, and many others served under Belgioioso.

Bocskai resisted, retreating two days later with considerable losses before the emperor's three-column army. Several Hajduk captains in Belgioioso's army (Balázs Lippai, Ferenc Ibrányi, Mihály Dengeleghy, Mátyás Szénássy, and Balázs Németi) were willing to change sides. One of the three imperial columns, led by Colonel Pezzen, joined Belgioioso's main army. The decisive battle of the first phase of the campaign took place at night in the woods between Álmosd and Diószeg. Bocskai encountered Pezzen's loose, stretched column of infantry, cavalry and cannons.

Bocskai's men surrounded Varad, but had few supplies. Belgioioso retreated towards Tokaj, and many of his soldiers had deserted.

Intervention of Giorgio Basta
Giorgio Basta, whose armies had successfully fought the Ottomans, marched from Esztergom against Bocskai's insurgents. Balázs Németi attacked him with his soldiers and peasant insurgents at Osgyán, but had been captured and executed by Basta.

After his victory in Osgyán, Basta marched to Edelény and the valley near Ládbesenyő; he was surrounded by Bocskai's armies and Turkish auxiliary troops. Although Basta burned his supplies, but two days later he found a weak link in the direction of Kassa. Kassa, defended by Miklós Segnyei's Hajduks, repelled him. Basta then marched to Eperjes, where he remained until April 1605.

Spreading across Hungary
Bocskai realized that he could not win in battle, but he could cut his opponent's supply lines. Headquartered in Kassa, he carefully organized his army, dissolved opposition from the Hajduks, serfs and nobility, and formulated plans for the operation with Ferenc Rhédey. Balazs Lippai killed many mercenaries and civilians, and Bocskai had him assassinated in January 1605.

Basta broke out of Eperjes once before April 1605, but found no opposition; he strengthened Tokaj (which remained loyal to the emperor) with food and ammunition, before retreating back to Eperjes. In early spring, he realized that he could not regain Hungary and retreated to Pozsony.

In May 1605, Gergely Némethy's Hajduks began to conquer the Transdanubian castles. They soon reached the Sopron–Kőszeg defensive line and, reinforced by Turkish auxiliaries, ventured into Austria. Némethy unsuccessfully tried to enlist Styrian and Croatian troops. The region had a tradition of anti-Turkish sentiment, and Némethy was unable to conquer the western cities protecting Vienna. Although imperial troops in Western Transdanubia counterattacked in September, Némethy held back a significant force.

The emperor's armies counterattacked in the districts of Komárom, Érsekújvár and Esztergom, and Mátyás Somogyi transferred his three thousand western-Hungarian troops to the imperial side.  Most of the country's fortresses, however, were captured by the insurgents.

A battle for Transylvania began in October; Szatmar was besieged, falling to the insurgents at the end of January after the imperial supply line was cut. László Gyulaffy was Bocskai's first governor of the region until his death the following July. The Estates occupied Transylvania without a major battle. On February 21, 1605, Bocskai was elected Prince of Transylvania by the Szeklers and the county nobility in Nyárádszereda.  In April, the Assembly of Szerencs appointed him Prince of Hungary. He refused to negotiate with Rudolf's peace envoys at first, finally agreeing to do so that year.

Treaties 
The Treaty of Vienna, concluded on June 23, 1606, ensured Hungarian rights and gave the counties of Szatmár, Bereg and Ugocsa to Transylvania for the life of its descendants. On September 24, Rudolf issued a proclamation that he would hand over Ugocsa, Bereg, Szatmár and Szabolcs counties, Tokaj castle, and the market towns of Tarcal, Bodrogkeresztúr and Olaszliszka to Bocskai. The Peace of Zsitvatorok, signed later that year, ended the Long Turkish War.

Timeline
1604
Colonel Concini attacks Kereki
October 14–15: Battle of Álmosd
October 15: Debrecen captured by Bocskai
Late October: Battle of Tokaj against Belgioioso 
October 31: Lippai-Nemeti manifesto
November 11: Bocskai enters Kassa
November 14: Battle of Ostyan Basta; Balazs Nemeti captured and executed
End of November: Battle of Edelény
December: Kassa resists Basta, who marches to Eperjes; Rhedey's army loots West-Felvidék and endangers Basta's supply lines.
December 1: Bocskai issues a manifesto in Göncz asking the nobility to join him. 
End of December: Manifesto of Balazs Lippai
1605
January: Balazs Lippai assassinated by Bocskai; Szatmar captured by Bocskai's troops.
February 21: Bocskai elected Prince Of Transylvania. 
April: Basta retreats from Eperjes to Pozsony.
April 17: Manifesto from the Estates who joined Bocskai. Bocskai elected Prince of Hungary in Szerencs; Tachtamis, khan of Crimea, is ordered by the Ottomans to assist him. 
May: Bocskai's troops reach Transdanubia (Dunántúl).
September: Rudolf's troops counterattack in western Hungary,
Autumn: Assembly in Korpona
November 11: Bocskai and Grand Vizier Lalla Mehmed meet in Pest County.
December 12: Bocskai settles the Hajduks and makes them nobles.
1606
June 23: Treaty of Vienna
December 17: Bocskai dictates his will. 
December 29: Bocskai dies under suspicious circumstances; his men blame (and kill) Mihály Káthay.

See also 

 List of revolutions and rebellions

Further reading
Barta, Gábor (1994). "The Emergence of the Principality and its First Crises (1526–1606)". In Köpeczi, Béla; Barta, Gábor; Bóna, István; Makkai, László; Szász, Zoltán; Borus, Judit (eds.). History of Transylvania. Akadémiai Kiadó. pp. 247–300. .
Benda, Kálmán (1993). Bocskai István [Stephen Bocskai] (in Hungarian). Századvég. .
Cartledge, Bryan (2011). The Will to Survive: A History of Hungary. C. Hurst & Co. .
G. Etényi, Nóra; Horn, Ildikó; Szabó, Péter (2006). Koronás fejedelem: Bocskai István és kora [A Crowned Prince: Stephen Bocskai and his Time] (in Hungarian). General Press Kiadó. .
Granasztói, György (1981). "A három részre szakadt ország és a török kiűzése (1526–1605)". In *Benda, Kálmán; Péter, Katalin (eds.). Magyarország történeti kronológiája, II: 1526–1848 [Historical Chronology of Hungary, Volume I: 1526–1848] (in Hungarian). Akadémiai Kiadó. pp. 361–430. .
Kontler, László (1999). Millennium in Central Europe: A History of Hungary. Atlantisz Publishing House. .
MacCulloch, Diarmaid (2004). The Reformation: A History. Viking. .
Pálffy, Géza (2009). "Szabadságharc volt-e Bocskai István mozgalma? [Was Stephen Bocskai's movement a war for independence?]" (PDF). História (in Hungarian). 30 (1): 7–10. Retrieved 11 December 2016.

References

Sources 
Bánlaki, József: A magyar nemzet hadtörtenelme. I–XXII. Volume, Budapest, 1928–1942 Grill Károly Könyvkiadó[Volume XV]. https://mek.oszk.hu/09400/09477/html/0015/1194.html
Basta György hadvezér levelezése és iratai.[Giorgio Basta military leader's letters and documents]. II. Volume. 1602-1607 Editor and translator: Dr. Veress, Endre. Budapest, 1913. Akadémiai Kiadó 974 p
Benda, Kalman: Bocskai 1557–1606. First edition 1942, Second edition 1993. Budapest
Benda, Kalman: Habsburg-abszolutizmus és rendi ellenállás a XVI–XVII. században(The Habsburg absolutism and the resistance of the Estates in Hungary in the XVI-XVII centuries) Tankönyvkiadó, Bp., 1975
Benda Kálmán–Kenéz Győző: Barbiano generális jelentése a Bocskai-szabadságharc első hónapjairól. In: Hajdu Bihar megyei muzeumok kozlemenyei 19.szam. Hajduk a magyar történelemben II. Debrecen 1972. 5-29. p 
Benda Kálmán–Péter Katalin: Az országgyűlések a kora újkori magyar történelemben; MTA Történettudományi Int–OPI, Bp., 1987 
Benda Kalman:Bocskai szabadsagharc. Budapest, 1955, 159 p
Bocskai István levelei(Letters of Istvan Bocskai) (1992)
 
 
Istvánffy, Miklós Historianum de rebus Ungaricis libri. 1622 (Nicolai IsthuanfI Pannoni Historiarum de rebus Vngaricis libri 34, Antoni Hierati, 1622
Nagy László: Hajdúvitézek. Bp. 1986. 160-161
Nagy Laszlo: Bocskai es kora. Tanulmanyok a Bocskai szabadsagharc 400 adik evfordulojara. Martin optik kiado, Budapest, 2005. 114p

Nagy, Laszlo(editor): Iratok Bocskai István és kora történetéhez]. Debrecen 2005.  257 p[Documents the time of István Bocskai and his contemporaries. A plenty of letter what connect to Bocskai uprising from 45 p some in Latin]. 
 
Sinkovics(editor) :Magyar Történeti Szöveggyűjtemény[History text about the Hungarian History 1526-1790]1526-1790. I. Volume. Editor Istvan Sinkovics.  Szeged 1968. Tankönyvkiado. 554.p
Szerecz Miklós: Vitézség tükrei. Zrínyitől Rákócziig. – kézirat

External links
 Bocskai insurrection
Bocskai István végrendelete
Last Will of Istvan Bocskai 
Borbely, Zoltan: Homonnai Dugeth György. pp. 112-119 about trial of György Homonnai Dugeth
 BENDA Kalman Bocskaija es a Bocskai kultusz
 Filep Tamas Gusztav: Bocskai koronája (about interest debates how happened deconspiracy of Bocskai before the uprising). In: Kortárs 52 évfolyam 2. szám 2008 Febr.
Nyakas Miklós: Bocskai kiáltványa Sopron vármegye rendjeihez
Ortelius: Chronic :Ortelius Redivivus Et Continuatus, Oder Der Ungarischen Kriegs-Empörungen Historische Beschreibung Darinnen enthalten Alles was sich bey vorgenommenen Beläger- und Eroberungen der Stätte Vestungen und Schlösser dessgleichen in veranlassten Schlachten ... zwischentheils Christlichen Ungarischen Königen und dem Hochlöbl. Ertz-Hauss Oesterreich alss auff einer und dem Türcken ... auff der andern Seiten In Ober- und Nider-Ungarn Wie auch Siebenbürgen Von dem 1395. biss in das 1607. Jahr ... zugetragen ... zusammen gefasst und beschrieben worden Ortelius Redivivus Et Continuatus, Oder Der Ungarischen Kriegs-Empörungen Historische Beschreibung Darinnen enthalten Alles was sich bey vorgenommenen Beläger- und Eroberungen der Stätte Vestungen und Schlösser dessgleichen in veranlassten Schlachten ... zwischentheils Christlichen Ungarischen Königen und dem Hochlöbl. Ertz-Hauss Oesterreich alss auff einer und dem Türcken ... auff der andern Seiten In Ober- und Nider-Ungarn Wie auch Siebenbürgen Von dem 1395. biss in das 1607. Jahr ... zugetragen ... zusammen gefasst und beschrieben worden 
SZABÓ ANDRÁS PÉTER A Bocskai-felkelés képe a szepességi krónikákban

Long Turkish War
1600s conflicts
Hungary under Habsburg rule
Ottoman period in Hungary
Rudolf II, Holy Roman Emperor
Wars involving the Habsburg monarchy
Wars involving Hungary
Wars involving the Ottoman Empire
Wars involving Croatia
Wars involving Spain
Wars involving Moldavia
Wars involving Transylvania
Wars involving Wallachia
European wars of religion
Rebellions against the Habsburg monarchy
17th-century rebellions
1600s in the Habsburg monarchy
17th century in Hungary
1604